Robert Storm Petersen (19 September 1882 – 6 March 1949) was a Danish cartoonist, writer, animator, illustrator, painter and humorist.  He is known almost exclusively by his pen name Storm P.

Biography
He was the son of a butcher and grew up in Copenhagen in a lower middle class environment. After interrupted studies at the Academy of Art, he worked as a free-lance painter, illustrator and cabaret entertainer. Already during World War I he was a well-known artist, and from about 1920 onward he was almost a national "institution" as a humorist, partly because of his versatile interests. His first comic strip was printed in 1906, in the Danish tabloid Ekstra Bladet. He was for many years connected to the Copenhagen newspaper Berlingske Tidende as a comic writer and cartoonist.

As a humorist, Storm P. is related to British and American humor, with a strong touch of craziness and absurdity. Often his starting point is a plain Copenhagen jargon, combined with a Danish down-to-earth homespun philosophy and all kinds of fun and comedy; the common man's unimpressed comments on a crazy world.

Though normally loved by most of his countrymen, Storm P. has also been criticised for being too toothless and petit bourgeois. In spite of his social background and interest of poor milieus, he very seldom shows deeper social criticism or revolutionary opinions; the dramatic age in which he lived left rather small stamps on his work. On the other hand he was no staunch giggler; many of his paintings deal with death, sorrow and macabre themes. He  painted the victims of social injustice and misery, often with a strong touch of compassion. Melancholy and fear are not unknown to him, but his official appearance was optimistic.

Drawings and paintings
Petersen left about 60,000 drawings and 100 paintings of varied quality. His drawings are very often illustrated jokes, or series of a theme besides artist sketches. Among his favourite themes are the vagabonds – who are portrayed as dressed-up petty philosophers – and the circus milieu that he regarded with much warmth.

He is perhaps best known for his Storm P. machines, comic drawings of machines that perform very simple tasks through an unnecessarily complex and usually humorous series of actions. Other cartoonists who are known for similar machine drawings are Rube Goldberg and Heath Robinson. Besides that, he illustrated many books, often written by congenial authors – Mark Twain, Jerome K. Jerome and G. K. Chesterton, among others.

As a painter he is clearly influenced by names like Edvard Munch and Toulouse-Lautrec, but often with an independent naivist touch. Later on, Paul Klee and Wassily Kandinsky seem to have been an inspiration in spite of his often outspoken ridiculing of modern art. Among his many themes are extérieurs from Paris. La Morgue (1906) and Kultur (1908) are two of his most well known paintings.

Author
As an author, he wrote many short stories and tales, often parodies on detective stories or melodramas, small snap-shots from the Copenhagen lower middle class milieu, absurd and surrealistic tales or, especially, "monologues" put into the mouth of bums, artists, etc. Special kinds of tales were the monologues put into the mouth of his own dog, Vor ven Grog (1926–1935), in which he let the dog reflect on life, death and daily life, sometimes with a light touch of sadness and pity within the humour.

Comics
Storm P. is also well known in Denmark as the author of a number of comic strips (titles in Danish):

 De tre små mænd og nummermanden ("The Three Small Men and the Number Man") 1913–1923 is a play with situations:  three little men making mad pranks leading to success or failure, all accompanied by an even smaller man who delivers the numbers of the strip.

En underlig Mand ("A Strange Man") from the 1930s was an absurdist strip cartoon about a man who reacts illogically and solves problems in an unexpected way.

 Peter og Ping ("Peter and Ping"), 1922–1949 was his greatest success, a comic strip about a small citizen and his friend (or adopted son) Ping, a speaking penguin. Their experiences in Copenhagen, spiced by Ping's absurd expressions and jokes, were extremely popular and even led to the foundation of a Ping Club for children. It also caused some international attention and was sold to Great Britain.

 Dagens flue ("The Daily Fly") that started in 1939 were drawings illustrating humorous philosophical jokes which often contained a deeper meaning.

Theater work
Storm P. was also an occasional freelance actor and performed in several early Danish silent movies. He later acted in stage comedies to supplement his income. In 1920 Petersen created the first Danish animated cartoon titled Tre små mænd ("Three Small Men"). He also designed scenery for ballets and plays.

Tribute
In 1982 he was featured on a Danish Postal stamp.
On 19 September 2013, Google celebrated his 131st birthday with a Google Doodle in Denmark.

Storm P. Museum
Storm P. Museum first opened its doors to the public in 1977.
The museum building is housed in a former  police station which dates back to the mid-1880s. The museum features expressionistic watercolors and oil painting together with a comic strip library, sound clips, photographs, films and newspaper clippings. The  museum also hosts a variety of changing exhibitions and educational activities.

Quotes

 "Life is a circus: you go in, bow, run around, bow again and leave."
 "– What is your opinion of the world situation? – Nothing, something got in my eye."
 "There is something fishy about art that needs to be explained."
 "We human beings are strange creatures – we have to go underground because we have invented the aeroplane. (1939)"
 "Statistics is much like a streetlight. Not very enlightening, but nice for supporting you"
 "I'd like to buy a return ticket, please" – "to where?" – "here!"
 "It is difficult to make predictions, especially about the future," (this phrase is also sometimes, mistakenly, attributed to Yogi Berra).

Literature
 Henry Chafetz: Robert Storm Petersen (in: The American Scandinavian Review vol. 40, 1952.)
Ib Boye  (1982) Skuespilleren Storm P. (Carit Andersens Forlag)

Notes

References

External links
 Home page (entirely in Danish) of the Storm P. Museum at Frederiksberg (Copenhagen)
  (movie career)

1882 births
1949 deaths
Danish cartoonists
Danish comics artists
20th-century Danish illustrators
Danish poster artists
20th-century Danish painters
Danish humorists
Artists from Copenhagen